Prvonek is a village in the municipality of Vranje, Serbia. At the 2002 census the village had a population of 203 people.

References

Populated places in Pčinja District